Victoriahallen is an ice hockey arena in Nybro, Sweden. Since 2016 it has the sponsor name Liljas arena. "It's the fourth oldest ice hockey arena in Sweden and home to the club Nybro Vikings IF, currently playing in the third highest league of Sweden, Division 1, after being relegated from Hockeyallsvenskan, the second division, the season 2008–2009. The arena was finished in 1963 and was rebuilt in 1984. It takes around 3,000 spectators and the spectator record this far is 3,068 from the 2003–04 season in the Småland-derby between Nybro Vikings and Växjö Lakers.

Sources 
 Official homepage (Swedish only)
 Facts from the official homepage (Swedish only)
 History timeline (Swedish only)

Indoor ice hockey venues in Sweden
Ice hockey venues in Sweden